Béla of Hungary  may refer to:

 Béla I of Hungary ( 1016–1063), Roman Catholic Hungarian monarch
 Béla II of Hungary ( 1110–1141), Roman Catholic Hungarian monarch
 Béla III of Hungary ( 1148–1196), Roman Catholic Hungarian monarch
 Béla IV of Hungary (1206–1270), Roman Catholic Hungarian monarch
 Béla V of Hungary (1261–1312), Roman Catholic Hungarian monarch